Crow Hop Dam is a lowhead dam on the Chattahoochee River.  The dam was built to channel the river westward around the west side of Hills Island to increase generation capacity at Riverview Dam slightly downstream. It is very close to, but does not touch, the Alabama state line, which here lies along the river's western bank, in Chambers County, Alabama, west of Hills Island.

Georgia Power has applied for permission to remove Crow Hop Dam in 2023.

References 

DCrow Hop
Dams in Georgia (U.S. state)
Buildings and structures in Harris County, Georgia